Bad Karlshafen is a baroque, thermal salt spa town in the district of Kassel, in Hesse, Germany. It has 2300 inhabitants in the main ward of Bad Karlshafen, and a further 1900 in the medieval village of Helmarshausen. It is situated at the confluence of the Diemel and Weser rivers, 15 km south of Höxter, and 37 km north of Kassel.

History
The town was founded in 1699 by French Huguenots fleeing persecution in France. Though initially named Sieburg, the town was later named after Charles I, Landgrave of Hesse-Kassel, who granted them refuge. The German Huguenot Museum located here contains a picture archive, library, and family histories of the Huguenots in Germany. Charles I, Landgrave of Hesse-Kassel, had ambitious plans for town-planning and developing new water trade channels in the region; including a 'haven' in Karlshafen. Together with his engineer and architect Friedrich Conradi he developed plans for a Landgrave-Carl-Canal in order to avoid customs duty at Hannoversch Münden, but these were never finalised. Plans for Bad Karlshafen, however, were partially completed in a baroque style by architect Paul du Ry in 1717 and the town was renamed as Carlshaven.

Since 1977 Karlshafen has spa status, which is when it received the title 'Bad'.

Mayor
Ulrich Otto was elected in 2005 with 62,94 % of the votes, he was reelected in 2011 with 78,32 % of the votes.

Leisure and health
Bad Karlshafen is a spa town (Bad = spa), which offers a modern health centre, the Weser Therme, based on a thermal salt spring, and in 1986 a graduation tower was established.

Transport

Bad Karlshafen railway station offers services between Ottbergen and Göttingen, at roughly a 2 hourly frequency, with bicycle space.
 Bus services also operate in the area.

Sons and daughters of the town

 Hermann Suchier (1848-1914), linguist
 Georg Zülch (1870-1942), lawyer and politician ( DNVP)
 Günter Frankenberg, (born 1945), lawyer
 Wilhelm Hubweges (1905-1971), sculptor and painter
 Andreas Thiele (born 1980), actor
 Sebastian Schachten (born 1984), football player

References

Kassel (district)
Reinhardswald
Spa towns in Germany